Gabbra are ethnic Somali clan, which closely related to the garre clan of the Somali people. They mainly inhabit the Moyale and Marsabit regions of northern Kenya and the highlands of southern Ethiopia.They mostly practice Islam and as their main religion but maintain mandatory cultural practice.

Genetics
According to Y-DNA analysis by Hirbo (2011), around 82.6% of Gabra in Kenya carry the paternal E1b1b haplogroup, with most belonging to the V12 or E3b1a subclade (58.6%). This lineage is most common among local Afroasiatic-speaking populations. The remaining Gabra individuals bear the T/K2 (3.4%) and J haplogroups (3.4%), which are both also associated with Afroasiatic speakers, as well as the E3*/E-P2 clade (3.4%) and E2a lineage (3.4%).

Maternally, Hirbo (2011) observed that approximately 58% of the Gabra samples carried derivatives of the Eurasian macrohaplogroups M and N. Of these mtDNA lineages, the M1 subclade was most common, with around 22.58% of the Gabra individuals belonging to it. The remaining ~42% of the analysed Gabra bore various subclades of the Africa-centered macrohaplogroup L. Of these mtDNA lineages, the most frequently borne clade was L3 (19.36%), followed by the L0a (9.68%), L4 (9.68%), and L2 (6.45%) haplogroups.

The Gabra's autosomal DNA has been examined in a comprehensive study by Tishkoff et al. (2009) on the genetic affiliations of various populations in Africa. According to Bayesian clustering analysis, the Gabra generally grouped with other Afroasiatic-speaking populations inhabiting Northern Kenya.

References

Tablino, Paul (1999): The Gabra: Camel Nomads of Northern Kenya. 
Kassam, Aneesa (2006): "The People of the Five "Drums": Gabra Ethnohistorical Origins." in Ethnohistory. 53(1):173-193;  (PDF)
Wood, John (1999): When Men Are Women: Manhood Among Gabra Nomads of East Africa. University of Wisconsin Press.

Further reading 
 Günther Schlee: Interethnic Clan Identities among Cushitic-Speaking Pastoralists, in: Africa: Journal of the International African Institute, Vol. 55, No. 1 (1985), Edinburgh University Press
 Muchemi Wachira: Neither Ethiopian Nor Kenyan, Just Gabra, Garre Or Borana, in: The East African, 31. August 2009 

Ethnic groups in Ethiopia
Ethnic groups in Kenya
Cushitic-speaking peoples
Islam in Kenya
Islam in Ethiopia